The Critics' Choice Movie Award for Best Editing is one of the Critics' Choice Movie Awards given to people working in the film industry by the Critics Choice Association. It was first given out in 2010.

Winners and nominees

2000s

2010s

2020s

Multiple winners
3 wins
 Lee Smith

2 wins
 Tom Cross

Multiple nominees (3 or more)
5 nominations
 Joe Walker

4 nominations
 Tom Cross
 Michael Kahn
 Lee Smith

3 nominations
 Kirk Baxter
 Thelma Schoonmaker

See also
 BAFTA Award for Best Editing
 Academy Award for Best Film Editing
 Independent Spirit Award for Best Editing
 American Cinema Editors Award for Best Edited Feature Film – Dramatic
 American Cinema Editors Award for Best Edited Feature Film – Comedy or Musical

References

External links
 Official website

E
Awards established in 2010
Lists of films by award
Film editing awards